Frobisher's Farthest is one of the many uninhabited Canadian arctic islands in Qikiqtaaluk Region, Nunavut. It is a Baffin Island offshore island located in Frobisher Bay, southeast of Iqaluit.

The island was named by Arctic explorer Charles Francis Hall.

Other islands in the immediate vicinity include Algerine Island, Alligator Island, McBride Island, Mitchell Island, and Pink Lady Island.

References 

Islands of Baffin Island
Islands of Frobisher Bay
Uninhabited islands of Qikiqtaaluk Region